Alligatorellus is an extinct genus of atoposaurid crocodyliform found in France that was related to Atoposaurus.

A skeleton of Alligatorellus has also been found in the Solnhofen Limestone of Kelheim, Germany. The limestone was deposited in a marine environment and the individual may have washed into a lagoon where it was fossilized. Remains of four crinoids that lived in the lagoon are found in the same block as the skeleton. The skeleton includes osteoderms and limb bones, which are three-dimensionally preserved. The German skeleton shows more details of atoposaurid anatomy than most fossils, as other atoposaurid remains are compressed flat.

References

Late Jurassic crocodylomorphs of Europe
Neosuchians
Fossil taxa described in 1871
Prehistoric pseudosuchian genera